Eclecticus may refer to:
 Eclecticus (amphipod), a genus of amphipods in the family Lysianassidae
 Eclecticus (plant), a genus of plants in the family Orchidaceae